Nuclear Polynesian refers to those languages comprising the Samoic and the Eastern Polynesian branches of the Polynesian group of Austronesian languages.

The Eastern Polynesian group comprises two major subgroups: Rapa Nui, spoken on Easter Island, and Central-Eastern, which is itself composed of Rapan, and the Marquesic and Tahitic languages.

Nuclear Polynesian is differentiated, among Polynesian languages, by its distinguishing characteristics from the Tongic languages spoken in most of Tonga and in Niue.

Languages
Samoic
East Uvean–Niuafo'ou languages
Ellicean languages
Futunic languages
Pukapuka
Samoan
Tokelauan
Eastern Polynesian
Rapa Nui
Central Eastern Polynesian
Rapa
Marquesic languages
Hawaiian
Marquesan
Northern
Southern
Mangerevan
Tahitic languages
Austral
Māori
Tuamotuan
Penrhyn
Rarotongan
Rakahanga-Manihiki
Tahitian

Alternative classification
Futunic languages
Pukapuka
Ellicean languages
Samoic
Samoan
Tokelauan
Ellicean–Outlier
Tuvaluan
Nukuoro
Kapingamarangi
Nukuria
Takuu
Nukumanu
Ontong Java
Sikaiana
Pileni
Eastern Polynesian

References